Jean Campbell may refer to:
 Jean Campbell (baseball), catcher in the All-American Girls Professional Baseball League
 Jean Campbell (canoeist), American slalom canoeist
 Jean Campbell (model), British fashion model
 Jean Campbell (novelist), Australian writer
 Jean Helen St. Clair Campbell, Girl Guide Chief Commissioner

See also
 Jeanne S. Campbell, American fashion designer active 1940s–1970s
 Lady Jeanne Campbell, British socialite, actress, and foreign correspondent